Woodchuck Hill is a summit located in Central New York Region of New York located in the Town of Newport in Herkimer County, east of Newport.

References

Mountains of Herkimer County, New York
Mountains of New York (state)